José Altagracia González Uribe (January 21, 1959 – December 8, 2006) was a Dominican Major League Baseball shortstop from  until . Most of his ten-year career was spent with the San Francisco Giants. He played for the Giants in the 1989 World Series against the Oakland Athletics.

Minor leagues
In eight games with the Cards, Uribe batted .211 with three runs batted in and four runs scored.

"The ultimate player to be named later"
In February , Uribe, David Green, Dave LaPoint and Gary Rajsich were dealt to the San Francisco Giants for Jack Clark. Between the time of the initial trade and his delivery, he changed his name from José González Uribe (Uribe is his mother's maiden name; González is his father's name. (See Spanish naming customs) to just José Uribe because, as he put it, "There are too many Gonzálezes in baseball!" Thus, he was humorously referred to as "the player to be named later" and sometimes "the ultimate player to be named later", a quote attributed to coach Rocky Bridges.

San Francisco Giants
Uribe was the Giants' principal shortstop for eight seasons, including their  National League Western Division championship and  National League pennant, leading the league with 85 double plays in the latter season. In the 1987 National League Championship Series he had a two-run single with the bases loaded in the second inning of Game 5, giving the Giants a 4–3 lead. He then stole third base and scored as the Giants won 6–3 for a 3–2 series lead, though San Francisco went on to lose the final two games. He won the 1988 Willie Mac Award honoring his spirit and leadership.

Uribe was also a fan favorite at Candlestick Park, where the home crowd had a unique chant for the relatively light-hitting infielder. When he would come to bat, fans on one side of the stadium would shout "OOH!"  after which fans on the other side would respond with "REE-bay!". Giants fans would later use the same chant for Juan Uribe, José's second cousin. He also received the uncommon nickname José "Game Winning" Uribe from ESPN announcer Chris Berman when the stat known as the "Game Winning RBI" was an official statistic.

1990 Fleer baseball card
For several years, Jose Uribe's 1990 Fleer baseball card was considered a "common" in a dramatically over-produced baseball set. However, in 2018, several of these cards began selling on eBay for hundreds of thousands of dollars with claims that they are rare.

According to eBay sold listings data, some copies of this card have sold for enormous amounts, though according to Beckett Media, those sales are dubious at best. Beckett has stated that there is nothing rare or uncommon about the card, and its exorbitant asking price in some auctions has no definable merit.

Personal life
His first wife, Sarah, died at the age of 27 of a heart attack, two days after giving birth to their third child.

Uribe was killed, at age 47, December 8, 2006, in a car crash at about 3:00 a.m. near his hometown of Juan Baron, Palenque, Dominican Republic. He is survived by his second wife, Wendy Guerrero, with whom he had four children. He was a second cousin of former major league infielder Juan Uribe.

References

External links

1959 births
2006 deaths
Dominican Republic expatriate baseball players in the United States
Houston Astros players

Major League Baseball players from the Dominican Republic
Major League Baseball shortstops
People from San Cristóbal Province
Road incident deaths in the Dominican Republic
San Francisco Giants players
St. Louis Cardinals players
Arkansas Travelers players
Louisville Redbirds players
Phoenix Firebirds players
San Jose Giants players
St. Petersburg Cardinals players